Thomas John Miller (born August 11, 1944) is an American lawyer and politician who served as the 33rd Attorney General of Iowa from 1995 to 2023. After the defeat of West Virginia Attorney General Darrell McGraw in 2012 when running for reelection, Miller became the longest serving State Attorney General in the United States.

A member of the Democratic Party, he previously served in the same position from 1979 to 1991 as the state's 31st Attorney General. Miller's combined tenure of over 38 years in office makes him the longest serving State Attorney General in United States history, having surpassed Frank J. Kelley's 37-year term of office as Michigan Attorney General; Kelley still holds the record for longest continuous tenure as an attorney general, having served from 1961 to 1999.

Early life and education 
Miller was raised in Dubuque, Iowa to parents Elmer and Betty Miller. His father was a longtime county assessor. He graduated from Wahlert Catholic High School in Dubuque, earned his undergraduate degree at Loras College in Dubuque, and completed his J.D. degree at Harvard Law School in 1969.

Early career
Miller served as an AmeriCorps VISTA volunteer in Baltimore for one year and as a legislative assistant to U.S. Representative John Culver of Iowa. He worked for the Baltimore Legal Aid Bureau, and taught at the University of Maryland School of Law.

In 1973, Miller returned to northeast Iowa and opened a law practice in McGregor, Iowa. He served as the city attorney for McGregor and Marquette, Iowa for five years. In 1974, he won the Democratic nomination for Attorney General of Iowa, but lost the general election to Republican incumbent Richard C. Turner.

Attorney General 
Miller was first elected Attorney General of Iowa in 1978, defeating Richard Turner in a rematch. He was re-elected in 1982 and 1986. In 1990 Miller ran for governor and lost to Donald Avenson in the Democratic primary.  After that loss, Miller worked in private practice with the Des Moines office of the Faegre & Benson law firm. He was again elected Attorney General in 1994, and was re-elected in 1998, 2002, 2006, 2010, 2014, and 2018. Miller narrowly lost the 2022 election to Brenna Bird (a rematch of 2010). He was the longest-serving state attorney general in U.S. history.

Electoral history

References

Explanatory notes

Citations

External links

Iowa Attorney General's office
 Tom Miller for Iowa Attorney General campaign website

|-

|-

|-

1944 births
21st-century American politicians
Harvard Law School alumni
Iowa Attorneys General
Iowa Democrats
Iowa lawyers
Living people
Politicians from Dubuque, Iowa